Jelena Stanivuk (born 17 February 1988) is a Bosnia and Herzegovinan former tennis player who also competed for Croatia. She was studying at Baylor University, between 2007–2011.

Playing for Bosnia and Herzegovina in the Fed Cup, Stanivuk has a win/loss record of 1–3. In 2013, she was the captain of the Bosnia and Herzegovina Fed Cup team.

ITF finals

Doubles: 5 (2–3)

Junior career
Stanivuk has a career-high ITF juniors ranking of 482, achieved on 29 March 2005.

ITF Junior Circuit finals

Doubles (0–1)

National representation

Fed Cup
Stanivuk made her Fed Cup debut for Bosnia and Herzegovina in 2012, while the team was competing in the Europe/Africa Zone Group I.

Fed Cup (1–3)

Singles (0–1)

Doubles (1–2)

References

External links
 
 
 

1988 births
Living people
Sportspeople from Tuzla
Bosnia and Herzegovina female tennis players
Baylor Bears women's tennis players